Senator Wilkins may refer to:

Beriah Wilkins (1846–1905), Ohio State Senate
Edness Kimball Wilkins (1896−1980), Wyoming State Senate
George Wilkins (Vermont politician) (1817–1902), Vermont State Senate
Hank Wilkins (born 1954), Arkansas State Senate
William Wilkins (American politician) (1779–1865), U.S. Senator from Pennsylvania

See also
James W. Wilkin (1762–1845), New York State Senate